
The following is a list of Playboy Playmates of 1975.  Playboy magazine names their Playmate of the Month each month throughout the year.

January

Lynnda Kimball (born May 1, 1952) is an American model. She was Playboy magazine's Playmate of the Month for the January 1975 issue. Her centerfold was photographed by Mario Casilli.

February

Laura Misch (born November 23, 1953) is an American model, actress and writer. She was Playboy magazine's Playmate of the Month for the February 1975 issue. Her centerfold was photographed by Richard Fegley.

March

Ingeborg Sørensen (born May 16, 1948) is a Norwegian model.  She was Playboy magazine's Playmate of the Month for its March 1975 issue. Her centerfold was photographed by Mario Casilli.

April

Victoria Cunningham (born May 28, 1952) is an American actress and model.  She was Playboy magazine's Playmate of the Month for the April 1975 issue. Her centerfold was photographed by Mario Casilli. She also appeared on the cover of the March 1976 issue of Playboy.

May

Bridgett Rollins (September 7, 1956 – February 12, 2011) was an American model. She was Playboy magazine's Playmate of the Month for the May 1975 issue. Her centerfold was photographed by Pompeo Posar.

Rollins died at her home, with her husband and sister by her side, after a four-year battle with cancer.  At the time of her death, she had two sons and a daughter.

June

Azizi Johari (born August 24, 1948) is an American model and actress.  She was Playboy magazine's Playmate of the Month for its June 1975 issue. Her centerfold was photographed by Ken Marcus.

July

Lynn Schiller (born March 5, 1951) is an American model and actress.  She was Playboy magazine's Playmate of the Month for its July 1975 issue. Her centerfold was photographed by Larry Dale Gordon.

August

Lillian Müller (born August 19, 1952) is a Norwegian model and an actress in motion pictures and television. A "Page Three girl" on January 30, 1974, Müller achieved her major breakthrough after being spotted by Suze Randall, who photographed her centerfold (along with Dwight Hooker) for Playboy. Müller appeared in the magazine as Playmate of the Month in August 1975, and was subsequently named Playmate of the Year in 1976.

Müller appeared in Van Halen's "Hot for Teacher" video and portrayed Rod Stewart's love interest in his 1978 video "Da Ya Think I'm Sexy?"

She is sometimes credited as Inga Anderssen, Lillian Mueller, Yulis Revel, Yuliis Ruval, or Yullis Ruval.

September

Mesina Miller (born July 7, 1953) is an American model.  She was Playboy magazine's Playmate of the Month for its September 1975 issue. Her centerfold was photographed by William Figge, Mel Figge, and Suze Randall.

October

Jill De Vries (born July 20, 1953) is an American model. She was  Playboy magazine's Playmate of the Month for the October 1975 issue. Her centerfold was photographed by Dwight Hooker. De Vries's was the first Playboy gatefold to be signed by the model. De Vries was studying to be a teacher at the time of her pictorial. She appeared briefly as a call girl in the 1983 comedy Risky Business. She was also the cover model for the Christina novels.

November

Janet Paula Lupo (January 26, 1950 – November 13, 2017) was an American model and the Playboy Playmate of the Month for November 1975. Her centerfold was photographed by Pompeo Posar. Lupo posed for an April 1984 Playboy pictorial, "Playmates Forever! Part Two". She was also a Playboy Bunny at the resort in Great Gorge, New Jersey.

By 1981, Lupo had a license to sell real estate. In 1986, she had a son with her longtime partner. A few years later, she obtained a cosmetology license.

Lupo died in Jersey City, New Jersey, at the age of 67.

December

Nancie Li Brandi (born August 30, 1954) is an American model. She was Playboy magazine's Playmate of the Month for the December 1975 issue. Her centerfold was photographed by Richard Fegley. The centerfold of Miss June 1993, Alesha Oreskovich, was modeled after that of Li Brandi.

See also
 List of people in Playboy 1970–1979

References

1975-related lists
1975
Playmates Of 1975